Wendell Smith (March 23, 1914 – November 26, 1972) was an African American sportswriter who was influential in the choice of Jackie Robinson to become the first African American player in Major League Baseball in the 20th century.

Life and career
A Detroit native, Smith graduated from West Virginia State College where he pitched on the baseball team. One day after winning a game, a major league scout approached him and said that he wished that he could sign him, but couldn't due to baseball's color barrier, and instead signed the opposing pitcher. Thereafter, Smith promised himself that he'd do whatever he could to see an African American play major league baseball. He also became the sports editor for the college's newspaper his junior year. He began his professional writing career in 1937 with the Pittsburgh Courier, then the most popular paper within the black community in the country. He started as a sports writer and then a sports editor the year after. He covered the Homestead Grays and Pittsburgh Crawfords of baseball's Negro leagues for the Courier. Smith also petitioned the Baseball Writers' Association of America (BBWAA) for membership but was turned down because he was with the Courier and not one of the white-owned papers.

Smith is credited with recommending Jackie Robinson to Brooklyn Dodgers general manager Branch Rickey who was searching for the individual with strong character to successfully execute the integration of baseball. The Courier offered to pay for Smith to travel with Robinson, who had to stay in separate hotels from his teammates due to segregation policies prevalent at the time. Smith traveled with Robinson in the minor leagues in 1946 and with the Brooklyn Dodgers in 1947. In 1948, Smith released his book, Jackie Robinson: My Own Story.

Later, Smith moved on to Chicago and joined the white-owned Chicago Herald-American. Smith left his baseball beat and covered mostly boxing for the American. In 1947, his application to join the BBWAA was approved, and he became the first African American member of the organization.

Smith moved to television in 1964 when he joined Chicago television station WGN as a sports anchor, though he continued to write a weekly column for the Chicago Sun-Times. Smith died of pancreatic cancer at age 58 in 1972, just a month after Robinson. Smith had been too ill to attend Robinson's funeral, but he wrote Robinson's obituary.

Honors
In December 1993, Smith was voted the J. G. Taylor Spink Award for excellence in journalism by the BBWAA. The award was bestowed at the 1994 Baseball Hall of Fame induction ceremonies. His widow, Wyonella, donated his papers to the Hall of Fame's archives in 1996, providing invaluable research material on the subject of baseball's integration.

In 2014, Smith was the recipient of sports journalism's prestigious Red Smith Award from the Associated Press Sports Editors (APSE) organization.

DePaul University and the University of Notre Dame have presented the Wendell Smith Award to the best player of each game between the schools' men's basketball teams since the 1972–73 season.

In popular culture
André Holland portrayed Smith in the 2013 film 42, which tells the story of Jackie Robinson's selection to play for the Dodgers, his professional ordeals, and his early minor and major league play.

Notes

References

Further reading

 
 Biography from Black Athlete Sports Network

External links
 Baseball Hall of Fame: 1993 Spink Award
 Wendell Smith Papers at Hall of Fame

1914 births
1972 deaths
American sportswriters
Baseball writers
BBWAA Career Excellence Award recipients
Red Smith Award recipients
West Virginia State Yellow Jackets baseball players
20th-century American writers
Jackie Robinson
Writers from Detroit
Deaths from cancer in Illinois
Deaths from pancreatic cancer